Postal codes in South Korea are 5-digit numeric. A new system of post codes was introduced on August 1, 2015. The postal code of the Republic of Korea was first enacted on July 1, 1970, and was revised three times in 1988, 2000, and 2015.

History
It was first introduced on July 1, 1970. Were given for each post office zip code, and the region is given the three-digit and 2-digit, when have a postal code are assigned as 120-01 (Susaek-dong, Seodaemun-gu, Seoul), in the case of the old region, the 3-digit 100 (Seoul, Korea). Unlike the current ZIP code granted by the administrative district, in the postal code system was implemented in 1970, give a zip code, a post office by "taking into account the rail transport line. Therefore, the postal code and administrative area were often not consistent. The large post office used a three-digit postal code and the small post office used a five-digit postal code. For example, the Seoul Central Post Office was 100 and the Seoul Search Post was 120-01. 700 beondae military post, 800 beondae are Hwanghae, Pyongan the 900s, 000 beondae was Hamgyong. Were given a new six-digit postal code of eupmyeondong units on February 01, 1988 by administrative area, it was reflected in the administrative district reorganization and highway transportation network, such as the opening changes. 
400 units, which were not previously available, are allocated to Gyeonggi and Incheon areas, and 700 units, which are dedicated to military mail, have been changed to Gyeongbuk, Daegu.
On May 1, 2000, a postal code was assigned to each postal area of the delivery agent to make it easier to deliver mail to the postal code for each administrative area. The postal code assigned in 1988 is the basic goal. The postal code was subdivided to match the area in charge of each postman according to the completion of the national mailing system and the introduction of automated mail sorting equipment. 
According to the National Foundation District introduction, with street address laws enforced since January 2014 six-digit postal code was abolished in August 2015 from August 1, 2015, using the National Foundation District No. 5-digit postal code Doing. 
Notation Method 

1970 ~ 1987: Yes (Susaek-dong, Seodaemun-gu, Seoul) 120-01
1988 ~ July 2015: Yes (Susaek-dong, Eunpyeong-gu, Seoul) 122-090
August 2015 ~: Yes (Gangnam-gu, Seoul) 06000~06371

6-digit postal code (1988~2015)

Shipping number
The three digits in the front part of the postal code are the number for sending, and are the numbers assigned based on the administrative area of the destination. The first digit is assigned to each metropolitan administrative district (city, metropolitan, provincial, special autonomous, etc.), the second digit is assigned to the resident's living zone or concentrated country, and the third digit is assigned to each city, county, or district. In principle, when two or more basic municipalities are consolidating, and in the case of urban and rural complex without a ward, it is a principle to match the first three digits that were used differently before consolidation, but this is not the case if the postal codes can overlap. For example, in the case of Iksan-si, 570 for the former Iri-si and 572 for the former Iksan-gun were used, but there was no area where the three digits overlapped. However, in the case of Pyeongtaek-si, there were areas where the three digits overlapped, so the previous three digits are used differently.
The chart below records the administrative areas designated by the first three digits. Parentheses indicate the abolished administrative divisions. For the postal code assignment status in the administrative area prior to 1995, refer to the postal code change notice.

Delivery number
The delivery number is a number used to deliver the mail to the recipient, and is divided and assigned to match the area in charge of each delivery agent. It is divided into dongs and myeons, but it is also divided into buildings or mailbox units. It is assigned based on the statutory dong, and when there are multiple administrative dongs in the statutory dong, both the statutory dong and the administrative dong are assigned a postal code. Exceptionally, if there is one administrative dong in multiple statutory dongs, a postal code is assigned to each statutory dong, and a postal code is not assigned to administrative dongs.
In the case of apartments, 500 posts per day, and in the case of buildings or institutions, individual postal codes are assigned when there are more than 300 posts per day. For the delivery of the postal code of the bulk delivery service, the permission of the local post office is required.

For reference, 999-999 is a return number for a financial company, and is marked as "Right edited mailbox 999".

5-digit postal code (1970~1988)
The status of postal code assignment as of 1986 can be found on page 1014 of the 1986 Administrative District Overview.

Footnote
Ministry of Information and Communication
Currently there is only a nominal number, but there is no postal code in North Korea (the Democratic People's Republic of Korea), an unrecovered area.

References

South Korea
Postal system of South Korea